The Solo free routine competition of the 2016 European Aquatics Championships was held on 9 and 10 May 2016.

Results
The preliminary round was held on 9 May at 09:00. The final was started on 10 May at 16:30.

Green denotes finalists

References

Synchronised swimming